The Norwegian Booksellers' Prize (Bokhandlerprisen) is a literature prize awarded annually  by the Norwegian Booksellers Association after voting among all who work in Norwegian bookstores.

The prize is awarded for one of the year's books in the fiction / general literature category, including children's and youth books. The prize was initiated in 1948, then did not return until 1961. It was also on a hiatus from 1970 to 1980.

Prize winners 

1948 – Sigurd Hoel
1961 – Kristian Kristiansen 
1962 – Vera Henriksen
1963 – Terje Stigen 
1964 – Elisabeth Dored 
1965 – Johan Borgen
1966 – Ebba Haslund
1967 – Kristian Kristiansen and Tarjei Vesaas
1968 – Odd Eidem and Hans Heiberg  
1969 – Finn Alnæs and Richard Herrmann 
1981 – Leif B. Lillegaard
1982 – Anne Karin Elstad
1983 – Herbjørg Wassmo
1984 – Torill Thorstad Hauger
1985 – Jo Benkow
1986 – Anne-Cath. Vestly
1987 – Fredrik Skagen
1988 – Bjørg Vik
1989 – Gunnar Staalesen
1990 – Lars Saabye Christensen
1991 – Roy Jacobsen
1992 – Karsten Alnæs
1993 – Jostein Gaarder
1994 – Klaus Hagerup
1995 – Anne Holt
1996 – Ingvar Ambjørnsen
1997 – Karin Fossum
1998 – Erik Fosnes Hansen
1999 – Erlend Loe
2000 – Jo Nesbø
2001 – Lars Saabye Christensen
2002 – Åsne Seierstad
2003 – Per Petterson
2004 – Levi Henriksen
2005 – Anne B. Ragde
2006 – Erik Fosnes Hansen
2007 – Jo Nesbø
2008 – Tore Renberg
2009 – Roy Jacobsen
2010 – Jan-Erik Fjell
2011 – Jørn Lier Horst
2012 – Per Petterson
2013 – Cecilie Enger
2014 – Lars Mytting
2015 – Maja Lunde
2016 – Vigdis Hjorth
2017 – Helga Flatland
2018 – Simon Stranger
2019 – Lisa Aisato
2020 – Tore Renberg
2021 – Abid Raja

References

Norwegian literary awards